Zeldenrust is a smock mill in Dokkum, Friesland, Netherlands which was built in 1862 and has been restored to working order. The mill is listed as a Rijksmonument, number 13097. The name translates as, "Seldom at rest."

History
Zeldenrust was built in 1862 on the site of the Driepiepstermolen, which burnt down in 1861. The mill was built by millwright F van Delden of Olderker at a cost of ƒ9,400 for miller J M Bakker. In 1912, Bakker died at 81 and the business passed to his sons. In 1921, the mill was sold to Lukas Jan Graver, later passing to Jan Boomgaardt. In 1952, the mill was bought by Johan van Tilburg of Nieuw-Weerdinge, Drenthe. Tilburg fitted the mill with more efficient sails. He sold the mill in 1966 to the VVV at Dokkum. The mill was restored by millwright Doornbosch of Adorp, Groningen in 1968–69. A further restoration was carried out by millwright Jellema of Birdaard in 1995.

Description

Zeldenrust is what the Dutch describe as a "stellingmolen" . It is a three-storey smock mill on a four-storey base. The smock and cap are thatched. The mill is winded by tailpole and winch. The sails on the inner sailstock are Common sails, with leading edges streamlined on the Fok system. The sails on the outer sailstock are Ten Have sails, with leading edges fitted with aerofoils on the Fok system. The sails are carried on a cast-iron windshaft, which was cast by Prins van Oranje, The Hague in 1877. The windshaft also carries the brake wheel which has 63 cogs. This drives the wallower (32 cogs) at the top of the upright shaft. At the bottom of the upright shaft, the great spur wheel, which has 101 cogs. There are four pairs of millstones. One pair are French Burr stones, they are  diameter and are driven by a lantern pinion stone nut which has 27 staves. The second pair are Cullen stones, they are  diameter and are driven by a lantern pinion stone nut which has 28 staves. The third pair are used for producing pearl barley. They are  diameter and are driven by a lantern pinion stone nut which has 21 staves. The fourth pair are used for producing pearly barley. they are  diameter and are driven by a lantern pinion stone nut which has 23 staves.

Millers
Reference :-
 J M Bakker (1862–1912)
 Bakker (1912–21)
 Lukas Jan Graver (1921– )
 Jan Boomgaardt ( –1952)
 Johan H A Tilburg (1952–66)

Public access
Zeldenrust is open to the public by appointment.

References

Windmills in Friesland
Windmills completed in 1862
Smock mills in the Netherlands
Rijksmonuments in Friesland
Octagonal buildings in the Netherlands
1862 establishments in the Netherlands
19th-century architecture in the Netherlands